The local-area augmentation system (LAAS) is an all-weather aircraft landing system based on real-time differential correction of the GPS signal. Local reference receivers located around the airport send data to a central location at the airport. This data is used to formulate a correction message, which is then transmitted to users via a VHF Data Link. A receiver on an aircraft uses this information to correct GPS signals, which then provides a standard ILS-style display to use while flying a precision approach. The FAA has stopped using the term LAAS and has transitioned to the International Civil Aviation Organization (ICAO) terminology of Ground-Based Augmentation System (GBAS). While the FAA has indefinitely delayed plans for federal GBAS acquisition, the system can be purchased by airports and installed as a Non-Federal navigation aid.

History
The ground-based augmentation system (GBAS) with aviation standards identified in International Civil Aviation Organization (ICAO) Standards and Recommended Practices (SARPS), Annex 10 on radio-frequency navigation provides international standards for augmentation of GPS to support precision landing.  The history of these standards can trace back to efforts in the United States by the Federal Aviation Administration to develop a Local Area Augmentation System (LAAS). Many references still refer to LAAS, although the current international terminology is GBAS and GBAS Landing System (GLS).

GBAS monitors GNSS satellites and provides correction messages to users in the vicinity of the GBAS station. The monitoring enables the GBAS to detect anomalous GPS satellite behavior and alert users in a time frame appropriate for aviation uses. The GBAS provides corrections to the GPS signals with a resulting improvement in accuracy sufficient to support aircraft precision approach operations. For more information on how GBAS works, see GBAS-How It Works.

Current GBAS standards only augment a single GNSS frequency and support landings to Category-1 minima. These GBAS systems are identified as GBAS Approach Service Type C (GAST-C).  Draft requirements for a GAST-D system are under review by ICAO.  A GAST-D system will support operations to Category-III minima. Many organizations are conducting research in multi-frequency GBAS. Other efforts are exploring the addition of Galileo corrections for GBAS.

Honeywell has developed a Non-Federal CAT-1 GBAS which received system design approval from the Federal Aviation Administration (FAA) in September 2009 [1]. The GBAS installation at Newark Liberty International Airport achieved Operational Approval on September 28, 2012. A second GBAS installed at Houston Intercontinental Airport received operational approval on April 23, 2013. Honeywell systems are also installed internationally, with an operational system in Bremen, Germany.  Additional systems are installed or in the process of being installed.  Operational approval of several more systems is expected shortly.

Operation
Local reference receivers are located around an airport at precisely surveyed locations. The signal received from the GPS constellation is used to calculate the position of the LAAS ground station, which is then compared to its precisely surveyed position. This data is used to formulate a correction message which is transmitted to users via a VHF data link. A receiver on the aircraft uses this information to correct the GPS signals it receives. This information is used to create an ILS-type display for aircraft approach and landing purposes.  Honeywell's CAT I system provides precision approach service within a radius of 23 NM surrounding a single airport.  LAAS mitigates GPS threats in the Local Area to a much greater accuracy than WAAS and therefore provides a higher level of service not attainable by WAAS.
LAAS's VHF uplink signal is currently slated to share the frequency band from 108 MHz to 118 MHz with existing ILS localizer and VOR navigational aids. LAAS utilizes a Time Division Multiple Access (TDMA) technology in servicing the entire airport with a single frequency allocation. With future replacement of ILS, LAAS will reduce the congested VHF NAV band.

Accuracy
The current Category-1 (GAST-C) GBAS achieves a Category I Precision Approach accuracy of 16 m laterally and 4 m vertically. The goal of a to-be developed GAST-D GBAS is to provide Category III Precision Approach capability. The minimum accuracy for lateral and vertical errors of a Category III system are specified in RTCA DO-245A, Minimum Aviation System Performance Standards for Local Area Augmentation System (LAAS). The GAST-D GBAS will allow aircraft to land with zero visibility using 'autoland' systems.

Benefits
One of the primary benefits of LAAS is that a single installation at a major airport can be used for multiple precision approaches within the local area. For example, if Chicago O'Hare has twelve runway ends, each with a separate ILS, all twelve ILS facilities can be replaced with a single LAAS system. This represents a significant cost savings in maintenance and upkeep of the existing ILS equipment.

Another benefit is the potential for approaches that are not straight- in. Aircraft equipped with LAAS technology can utilize curved or complex approaches such that they could be flown on to avoid obstacles or to decrease noise levels in areas surrounding an airport.  This technology shares similar characteristics with the older Microwave landing system (MLS) Approaches, commonly seen in Europe.  Both systems allow lower visibility requirements on complex approaches that traditional Wide Area Augmentation Systems (WAAS) and Instrument Landing Systems (ILS) could not allow.

The FAA also contends that only a single set of navigational equipment will be needed on an aircraft for both LAAS and WAAS capability. This lowers initial cost and maintenance per aircraft since only one receiver is required instead of multiple receivers for NDB, DME, VOR, ILS, MLS, and GPS. The FAA hopes this will result in decreased cost to the airlines and passengers as well as general aviation.

Drawbacks
LAAS shares the drawbacks of all RF based landing systems; those being jamming both intentional or accidental.

Variations
The Joint Precision Approach and Landing System (JPALS) is a similar system for military usage.  Honeywell has developed the Honeywell International Satellite Landing System (SLS) 4000 series (SLS-4000) which received system design approval from the FAA on September 3, 2009, with a follow-on approval of an enhanced SLS-4000 (SLS-4000 Block 1) in September 2012.

Future
The FAA's National Airspace System (NAS) enterprise architecture is the blueprint for transforming the current NAS to the Next Generation Air Transportation System (NextGen). The NAS service roadmaps lay out the strategic activities for service delivery to improve NAS operations and move towards the NextGen vision. They show the evolution of major FAA investments/programs in today's NAS services to meet the future demand. The GBAS precision approaches is one of the investment programs that provide solution to "increase flexibility in the terminal environment" in the NextGen implementation plan.

The FAA expected to replace legacy navigation systems with satellite based navigation technology; however the FAA has indefinitely delayed plans for federal GBAS acquisition, the system can be purchased by airports and installed as a non-federal navigation aid. The FAA continues to develop GBAS systems and seek international standardization.

See also
Acronyms and abbreviations in avionics
Differential GPS
Global Positioning System
GPS and Geo Augmented Navigation
Instrument Landing System: ILS
Joint Precision Approach and Landing System is a similar system for military usage.
Precision approach
WAAS
 EGNOS
Autoland

References 

 
  
 IHS Aerospace – Honeywell (July 7, 2005). Honeywell to Update Local Area Augmentation System (LAAS) Prototype. Press Release.

External links 
 FAA GNSS Program Office
 FAA LAAS Fact Sheet
 Stanford LAAS Page 
 Honeywell Aerospace – DGPS – Satellite Landing System
 Thales ATM  Satellite Navigation Systems
 flygls.net lists all GLS sites worldwide

Aircraft instruments
Global Positioning System
Satellite navigation